Grihalakshmi Ka Jinn is  a Hindi television drama series that aired on Zee TV channel in 1994. It showed a story of an Indian housewife's confrontation with real life problems. This character was portrayed by Rita Bhaduri. She constantly wished that she had a magic wand to solve her problems in a matter of minutes. One day she finds that God has sent her a genie (played by Raj Zutshi) in response to her prayers. Now, with the help of her genie, she is able to face and solve all the problems in her life. The genie has batteries for food and a small pony tail.

Cast
Rita Bhaduri as Housewife
Raj Zutshi as Jinn
Akhil Mishra as IAS Officer
Manju Mishra as Amma ji
Ninad Kamat
Firdaus Dadi

References

1994 Indian television series debuts
1997 Indian television series endings
Indian television soap operas
Zee TV original programming
Genies in television
Jinn in popular culture